The Mushroom Club is a 2005 documentary short subject, directed by Steven Okazaki.

The short film is about the nuclear bomb dropped on Hiroshima and its effects on the residents of that city sixty years later.

On January 31, 2006 it was nominated for the Academy Award for Best Documentary Short Subject. It lost to A Note of Triumph: The Golden Age of Norman Corwin.

References

External links
 
 
The Mushroom Club at Farallon Films

2005 films
2005 short documentary films
American short documentary films
Films about Japanese Americans
Documentary films about the atomic bombings of Hiroshima and Nagasaki
Films directed by Steven Okazaki
Films scored by Mark Orton
2000s English-language films
2000s American films